Timbuktu Airport  is an airport in Timbuktu, Mali opened on April 15, 1961.

Airlines and destinations

The start of Sky Mali's service to Timbuktu in February 2021 marked the first commercial flights to the airport since the city was captured by jihadists in 2012.

References

Airports in Mali
Airports established in 1961
1961 establishments in Mali
Neo-Sudanic architecture